Eric Lowndes (born 1994)  is an Irish Gaelic footballer. His league and championship career as a corner-back at senior level with the Dublin county team has lasted four seasons since 2014.

Lowndes made his debut on the inter-county scene when he was selected for the Dublin minor teams as a dual player in 2011. After back-to-back All-Ireland defeats with the hurlers, he ended his minor career as an All-Ireland medal winner with the footballers in 2012. He subsequently joined the Dublin under-21 team and won an All-Ireland medal in this grade in 2014. Lowndes made his senior debut during the 2014 league. Since then he has won three successive All-Ireland medals. Lowndes has also won four Leinster medals and three National League medals.

Honours
Dublin
All-Ireland Senior Football Championship (3): 2015, 2016, 2017
Leinster Senior Football Championship (4): 2014, 2015, 2016, 2017
National Football League (4): 2014, 2015, 2016, 2018
All-Ireland Under-21 Football Championship (1): 2014
Leinster Under-21 Football Championship (2): 2014, 2015
All-Ireland Minor Football Championship (1): 2012
Leinster Minor Football Championship (2): 2011, 2012
Leinster Minor Hurling Championship (2): 2011, 2012

References

1994 births
Living people
Dual players
Dublin inter-county Gaelic footballers
Dublin inter-county hurlers
Gaelic football backs
Irish schoolteachers
Sportspeople from Dublin (city)
Sportspeople from Fingal
St Peregrines Gaelic footballers
St Peregrines hurlers